Chamaescilla spiralis is a plant species in family Asphodelaceae and genus Chamaescilla. It is located in Western Australia. The species name spiralis is derived from the curled shape of its leaves.

References

Hemerocallidoideae
Asparagales of Australia
Flora of Western Australia